Detalik is a genus of western African jumping spiders. It was first described by Wanda Wesołowska in 2021, and it has only been found in Nigeria.  it contains only three species: D. anthonyi, D. ibadan, and D. idanrensis.

See also
 List of Salticidae genera

References

Salticidae genera
Endemic fauna of Nigeria